Logan Creek is a stream in western Reynolds County in the Ozarks of southeast Missouri. It is a tributary of the Black River.

The source area of the stream lies just south of Missouri Route 72 northwest of Reynolds. The stream flows south parallel to Missouri Route B and then turns east near the community of Exchange and flows parallel to Missouri Route 106 past northeast Ellington. East of Ellington the stream turns southeast and enters Clearwater Lake and its confluence with the Black River.

Logan Creek has the name of James Logan, a pioneer citizen.

See also
List of rivers of Missouri

References

Rivers of Reynolds County, Missouri
Rivers of Missouri
Tributaries of the Black River (Arkansas–Missouri)